Lovero is a comune (municipality) in the Province of Sondrio in the Italian region Lombardy, located about  northeast of Milan and about  east of Sondrio.

Lovero borders the following municipalities: Edolo, Sernio, Tovo di Sant'Agata, Vervio.

Demographic evolution

References

Cities and towns in Lombardy